The 2013 season was the Tampa Bay Buccaneers' 38th in the National Football League, and second under head coach Greg Schiano. It also marked the 19th and final season under the ownership of Malcolm Glazer, who died on May 28, 2014. The Buccaneers finished with a record of 4–12 and failed to improve their 7–9 record from last season, and were eliminated from postseason contention in Week 13. For the first time since 1996, longtime cornerback Ronde Barber was not on the roster, as he retired in May 2013.

Despite having a +10 turnover margin (tied for 3rd best in the NFL), and franchise rookie quarterback records from third round draft pick Mike Glennon, the overall offensive production ranked near the bottom of the league in most categories. The team ranked 32nd (last) in total yards, 32nd (last) in passing yards, 30th in total points scored. The team also had the third-most penalties in the league (121 for 1,136 yards), and ranked 31st in third down conversions. Running back Doug Martin went on injured reserve halfway through the season with a shoulder injury. His replacement, Bobby Rainey had a solid performance, scoring his first career touchdown, and setting a franchise record for longest touchdown run (80 yards). On the defensive side, the offseason news was highlighted by the free agent acquisition of Darrelle Revis, and Lavonte David's stellar numbers.

Season
The team got off to a dismal start, which created considerable tension inside and outside the locker room, as well as among fans. The fan support of head coach Greg Schiano began to decay, as illustrated by a local radio station erecting a billboard carrying the message "Fire Schiano." The trouble started on opening day, as Tampa Bay had a last-second loss to the Jets, owing primarily to a personal foul late hit penalty, which advanced the Jets into field goal range, and an improbable comeback victory. Late-game losses to New Orleans, Arizona, and Seattle brought the Buccaneers to an 0–8 start. The Buccaneers won four of their next five games, but were ultimately eliminated from playoff contention by December, and they dropped the last three games.

One day after the conclusion of the regular season, head coach Greg Schiano and general manager Mark Dominik were fired.

For the first time since 2009, all eight regular season home games were announced as a "sellout," and no regular season games were blacked out locally. Due to the new concussion rule, the Bucs did not wear their "creamsicle" throwback uniforms at all during this season.

Darrelle Revis was named the Sporting News Comeback Player of the Year.

Josh Freeman benching
The season started out on a rocky note, as reports of a rift between head coach Greg Schiano and starting quarterback Josh Freeman were coming from the locker room. Freeman was entering the final season of his contract, and trade rumors were already being tossed around by media and fans. An allegation surfaced that Schiano rigged the voting for team captains, which prevented Freeman from being selected by his teammates. The next day, Freeman missed the annual team photo session, an absence he blamed on "oversleeping." After starting the season 0–3, Freeman was quickly criticized for his poor offensive output, throwing a league-worst 45.3% completion percentage, two interceptions, and only two touchdown passes. It was also leaked that Freeman was a stage one participant in the NFL drug program, a situation related to his treatment of ADHD. On week four, Freeman was benched in favor of rookie Mike Glennon, and on October 3, 2013, Freeman was released from the team as he granted.

MRSA outbreak
During training camp, an outbreak of MRSA was reported in the Tampa Bay locker room. Carl Nicks and Lawrence Tynes contracted the infection over the summer. Nicks missed several games, while Tynes was placed on the non-football injured reserve list. After a third player, Johnthan Banks, was diagnosed in early October, the week 6 games against the Eagles was in jeopardy of postponement, due to concerns over transmission. However, it was held as scheduled after medical specialists and NFLPA representatives inspected the facility.

2013 Draft class

Trades
 The Buccaneers acquired an additional 2013 seventh-round pick (226th overall) that sent defensive tackle Brian Price to the Chicago Bears on July 26, 2012.
 The Buccaneers later traded that same additional 2013 seventh-round pick (226th overall) that was acquired by the Bears, along with cornerback Aqib Talib, to the New England Patriots in exchange for a 2013 fourth-round pick (126th overall) on November 1, 2012.
 Tampa Bay traded Arrelious Benn and a seventh-round pick to Philadelphia in exchange for the Eagles' 2013 sixth-round pick (196th overall) and a conditional draft pick in 2014.
 Tampa Bay traded their first-round pick (13th overall) and a conditional fourth-round pick in 2014, to the Jets in exchange for Darrelle Revis.
 Tampa Bay traded their fourth-round selection (112th overall) and their sixth-round selection (181st overall) to Oakland in exchange for the Raiders' fourth-round selection (100th overall) in order to draft Akeem Spence on the third day of the 2013 NFL Draft.
 Tampa Bay traded LeGarrette Blount to New England for Jeff Demps and a seventh-round selection (229th overall).
 Tampa Bay traded their sixth-round selection (196th overall) and their seven-round selection (229th overall) to Minnesota for a sixth-round selection (189th overall) in order to draft Mike James on the third day of the 2013 NFL Draft.
 Tampa Bay traded their 2014 sixth-round selection to Chicago for Gabe Carimi.

Staff

Final roster

Preseason

Regular season

Schedule

Game summaries

Week 1: at New York Jets

Tampa Bay took the lead 17–15 with a Rian Lindell field goal with 34 seconds remaining. However, on the ensuing Jets drive, Jets rookie quarterback Geno Smith scrambled for a 10-yard run to the right sideline. A personal foul penalty was called on Lavonte David of the Buccaneers for a late hit out-of-bounds, which advanced the Jets to the Buccaneers 30-yard line. With 2 seconds left in regulation, Nick Folk kicked a 48-yard field goal, and the Jets won the game 18–17.

Week 2: vs. New Orleans Saints

Tampa Bay took the lead 14–13 after an 85-yard interception return by Mason Foster with just under 13 minutes remaining. In the closing minutes the Buccaneers drove to the New Orleans 29 yard line, and attempted a field goal with 1:10 left. The kick missed, and the Saints took over with just over one minute left. Drew Brees drove the Saints to the Tampa Bay 9 yard line in three plays, and Garrett Hartley kicked the game-winning field goal as time expired.

Week 3: at New England Patriots

Tom Brady threw for 225 yards and two touchdown passes, as New England soundly defeated Tampa Bay 23–3. Josh Freeman was sacked three times, and threw one interception, while Doug Martin was held to only 88 yards rushing.

Week 4: vs. Arizona Cardinals

Quarterback Josh Freeman was benched during the week, and rookie Mike Glennon was elevated to the starting role. Glennon led the team to a 10–0 lead after three quarters, but miscues saw Tampa Bay fall late. Early in the 4th quarter, Glennon fumbling a hand-off to Doug Martin set up an Arizona field goal. With 3:23 left in the game, Glennon, deep in his own territory, threw a costly interception, which set up an Arizona touchdown, and a brief 10–10 tie. With 1:33 left in regulation, Arizona kicked the game-winning field goal to win 13–10.

Week 6: vs. Philadelphia Eagles

Eagles quarterback Nick Foles threw three touchdown passes and ran for another, as Philadelphia defeated Tampa Bay 31–20. The Buccaneers fell to 0–5.

Week 7: at Atlanta Falcons

Falcons quarterback Matt Ryan threw for 273 yards and three touchdowns, as Atlanta defeated Tampa Bay 31–23. The Buccaneers attempted to rally in the fourth quarter, but managed only two field goals. A failed onside kick by Tampa Bay with 1:55 left sealed the win for Atlanta.

Week 8: vs. Carolina Panthers

Cam Newton threw for 221 yards and two touchdown passes, and rushed for another touchdown, as Carolina defeated Tampa Bay 31–13. The Buccaneers failed to enter the red zone until the final three minutes of the game. Doug Martin sat out the game with an injured shoulder.

With the loss, Tampa Bay fell to 0–7.

Week 9: at Seattle Seahawks

Winless Tampa Bay shocked 7-1 Seattle by jumping out to a 21–0 lead just before halftime. However, the Seahawks came back in the second half to tie the game and force overtime. Tampa Bay won the coin toss in overtime, but went 3-and-out on their first possession. Seattle kicked a field goal on the next possession, completing their greatest comeback (21 points) in franchise history.

This loss dropped the Buccaneers to 0–8 on the season, a feat shared with the Jacksonville Jaguars.

Week 10: vs. Miami Dolphins

The Buccaneers defense allowed a franchise low 2 rushing yards for the entire game, besting the previous record set last season during the home opener, when the Buccaneers' rushing defense held Carolina to 10 rushing yards. Darrelle Revis caught the game winning interception off a desperation pass from Dolphins QB Ryan Tannehill late in the fourth quarter, and the Buccaneers won their first game of the season.

Week 11: vs. Atlanta Falcons

The Buccaneers managed a comprehensive victory against the Falcons, improving their record to 2–8.

Bobby Rainey rushed for 163 yards and 2 touchdowns. Vincent Jackson caught 10 passes for 165 yards and a touchdown. Gerald McCoy had 3 sacks in the game. Mike Glennon threw for 2 touchdowns. Mason Foster and Dashon Goldson both had an interception, the former of which returned it for a touchdown. Dekoda Watson blocked a punt.

Week 12: at Detroit Lions

Lions quarterback Matthew Stafford threw four interceptions, as Tampa Bay upset Detroit 24–21. The Buccaneers became the first team since 1978 to start the season 0–8 and win their next three games. Stafford was leading the Lions on a potential game-winning or game-tying drive in the final minute. At the Tampa Bay 28 yard line with 1:00 left, Stafford threw to Calvin Johnson at the 3 yard line. Johnson appeared to catch the ball, but it was stripped out and fell into the hands of Johnthan Banks for an interception, and sealed the win for Tampa Bay.

Week 13: at Carolina Panthers

Panthers QB Cam Newton threw for 263 yards and two touchdowns while running for another touchdown, as Carolina soundly defeated Tampa Bay 27–6, sweeping the season series.

With the loss, the Buccaneers were mathematically eliminated from playoff contention.

Week 14: vs. Buffalo Bills

Bobby Rainey scored an 80-yard rushing touchdown on the second play of the game and rushed for 127 yards total, setting the tone for the Buccaneers' decisive 27-6 thrashing of the Buffalo Bills.

On offense, Mike Glennon threw two touchdown passes, one each to Vincent Jackson and Tim Wright. The Buccaneers defense had seven sacks and four interceptions, out of which Lavonte David made one sack and two interceptions. On special teams, Dashon Goldson recovered a fumble muffed by the punt returner.

Week 15: vs. San Francisco 49ers

Vincent Jackson and Tim Wright caught the only two touchdowns for the Buccaneers in the game, which were not enough to stop the 49ers from trouncing the team 33–14. On defense, Gerald McCoy and Adrian Clayborn had the only sacks for the Bucs. Late in the game, Eric Page attempted to hand the ball to Russell Shepard on a tricky play during a kick return; however, Shepard fumbled the ball, allowing the 49ers' Kendall Hunter to recover and return it for a touchdown.

With the loss, the Buccaneers' record dropped to 4–10.

Week 16: at St. Louis Rams

On offense, Bobby Rainey scored the Bucs' only touchdown of the game. On defense, Gerald McCoy had a sack. Also Adrian Clayborn and Dekoda Watson both forced fumbles which Lavonte David and Keith Tandy both successfully recovered for the Buccaneers, though the offense was only able to get a field goal out of the resulting possessions.

Week 17: at New Orleans Saints

Standings

Division

Conference

References

External links
 

Tampa Bay Buccaneers season
Tampa Bay Buccaneers
21st century in Tampa, Florida
Tampa Bay Buccaneers seasons